This is a list of British television related events from 1941.

Events

There are no events for 1941 in British television as broadcasting had been suspended for the duration of the Second World War. This was done amid fears the signals would help German bombers. Television broadcasting resumed in 1946.

Births
 8 January – Graham Chapman, comedian (died 1989)
 19 January – Tony Anholt, Singaporean-English actor (died 2002)
 10 February – Michael Apted, director (died 2021)
 24 March – Humphrey Barclay, comedy producer
 4 April – Bill Tarmey, actor (died 2012)
 7 April – Gorden Kaye, comic actor (died 2017)
 18 May – Miriam Margolyes, actress 
 14 June – Mike Yarwood, impressionist and comedian
 25 June – Eddie Large, born Edward McGinnis, Scottish-born comedian (died 2020)
 29 July – David Warner, English actor
 4 August – Martin Jarvis, actor
 5 October – Stephanie Cole, actress
 20 October – Anneke Wills, actress
 28 October – John Hallam, actor (died 2006)
 17 November – Graham Haberfield, actor (died 1975)
 18 November – David Hemmings, English actor (died 2003)
 24 December – John Levene, British actor
 31 December 
 Johnny Leeze, actor (died 2020)
 Sarah Miles, theatre, film and television actress

See also
 1941 in British music
 1941 in the United Kingdom
 List of British films of 1941

References